Melrose is a village in Paulding County, Ohio, United States. The population was 275 at the 2010 census.

Geography
Melrose is located at  (41.090714, -84.419485).

All of it is land (there are no bodies of water).

Demographics

2010 census
As of the census of 2010, there were 275 people, 102 households, and 76 families living in the village. The racial makeup of the village was 99.3% White, 0.4% Asian, and 0.4% from two or more races. Hispanic or Latino of any race were 2.5% of the population.

There were 102 households, of which 42.2% had children under the age of 18 living with them, 48.0% were married couples living together, 17.6% had a female householder with no husband present, 8.8% had a male householder with no wife present, and 25.5% were non-families. 19.6% of all households were made up of individuals, and 6.9% had someone living alone who was 65 years of age or older. The average household size was 2.70 and the average family size was 3.05.

The median age in the village was 33.8 years. 30.5% of residents were under the age of 18; 6.6% were between the ages of 18 and 24; 22.5% were from 25 to 44; 28.3% were from 45 to 64; and 12% were 65 years of age or older. The gender makeup of the village was 48.4% male and 51.6% female.

2000 census
As of the census of 2000, there were 322 people, 111 households, and 83 families living in the village. The population density was 374.4 people per square mile (144.6/km2). There were 124 housing units at an average density of 144.2 per square mile (55.7/km2). The racial makeup of the village was 97.83% White, 2.17% from other races. Hispanic or Latino of any race were 2.17% of the population.

There were 111 households, out of which 42.3% had children under the age of 18 living with them, 53.2% were married couples living together, 13.5% had a female householder with no husband present, and 25.2% were non-families. 18.0% of all households were made up of individuals, and 8.1% had someone living alone who was 65 years of age or older. The average household size was 2.90 and the average family size was 3.35.

In the village, the population was spread out, with 31.1% under the age of 18, 14.9% from 18 to 24, 29.5% from 25 to 44, 16.1% from 45 to 64, and 8.4% who were 65 years of age or older. The median age was 28 years. For every 100 females there were 95.2 males. For every 100 females age 18 and over, there were 94.7 males.

The median income for a household in the village was $33,750, and the median income for a family was $39,688. Males had a median income of $36,250 versus  a female median income of $19,375. The per capita income for the village was $13,484. About 11.3% of families and 14.5% of the population were below the poverty line, including 22.7% of those under age 18 and 21.9% of those age 65 or over.

References

Villages in Paulding County, Ohio
Villages in Ohio